Miloje is a Serbian masculine given name of Slavic origin. It may refer to:

Miloje Miletić (born 1953), general
Miloje Milojević (1884–1946), musician
Miloje Petković (born 1967), retired footballer
Miloje Preković (born 1991), football goalkeeper

See also
Milojević

Slavic masculine given names
Serbian masculine given names